Gulf Creek is a  long 2nd order tributary to the Cape Fear River in Chatham County, North Carolina.

Course
Gulf Creek rises about 2 miles north of Corinth, North Carolina and then flows southwest to join the Cape Fear River about 0.5 miles south of Brickhaven, North Carolina.

Watershed
Gulf Creek drains  of area, receives about 47.6 in/year of precipitation, has a wetness index of 454.50 and is about 57% forested.

See also
List of rivers of North Carolina

References

Rivers of North Carolina
Rivers of Chatham County, North Carolina
Tributaries of the Cape Fear River